Kalamb is a town in Yavatmal district of Maharashtra state in India. It is famous today for its temple devoted to the Hindu god Ganesha and muslim scholar baba basuri wale. The temple is known as Shree Chintamani Temple, based on another name for Ganesh that emphasizes the belief that praying to him can remove worries ('Chinta' means worry in Sanskrit and in local Marathi language). It belongs to Vidarbha Ashtavinayak, one of the eight  Ganapati kshetras in Vidarbha. It is one of the 21 Kshetras of Ganesh throughout India. An annual fair of Shree Chintamani is held here. it is also famous for mosque jama masjid so beautiful in vidharb twin =
The Chakravati River flows through Kalamb city.
It has an average elevation of 283 metres.

It is not widely known that this otherwise unimportant village today was surprisingly an important revenue assessment center under the Mughal Empire in early seventeenth century as the capital of a Sarkar (sub-unit of a Mughal Subah) of the same name, earlier spelled as 'Kalam'.

Today, Kalamb is administrative center of a Taluka (sub-district) also called Kalamb. The Taluka has a population of about 96 thousand (2001 Census) and has over 140 villages. It is part of Vidarbha region. Vidarbha, was called Berar by the British and by the Mughals earlier. It was part of Central Provinces and Berar in British India between 1903 and 1947, and was part of Nizam of Hyderabad's territory until 1903.

Transport

By bus
Kalamb is on Yavatmal-Nagpur highway. You will find plenty of buses throughout the day and late night from Nagpur & Yavatmal. There are also buses plying from Amravati, Akola, Nanded.

By rail
The nearest railway station is Dhamangaon and Wardha which is on Mumbai-Nagpur route.but under construction as part of railway line from Wardha to Nanded. (Wardha - Yavatmal - Nanded).New Kalamb Railway Station It Will Be Constructed Behind Kalamb Matha on National Highway MH SH 236.The Station Code Is KALMB.

References

External links
 Chintamani Temple, Kalamb
 Official Site of Yavatmal District

Villages in Yavatmal district
Talukas in Maharashtra